19-Norandrostenedione may refer to:

 Bolandione (19-nor-4-androstenedione)
 19-Nor-5-androstenedione

See also
 19-Norandrostenediol (disambiguation)
 Androstenedione
 Androstenediol